Rattlesnake Lake is a lake in the northwest United States, located in Rattlesnake Mountain Scenic Area in King County, Washington, approximately  east of Seattle, south of Interstate 90.

History

The town of Moncton existed in 1906–1915 around the northern edge of Rattlesnake Lake. In the spring of 1915, it was destroyed by flooding caused by seepage of water from the newly created Chester Morse Lake into Rattlesnake Lake, and later condemned. Hardly any traces remain.

Management 
Rattlesnake Lake is part of the Rattlesnake Lake Recreation Area, which is owned and managed by Seattle Public Utilities as a non-development buffer to the protected municipal watershed lands. The watershed supplies 65% of the Seattle region’s unfiltered drinking water to nearly 800,000 people. However, Rattlesnake Lake itself is not used for drinking water and is spring-fed by the nearby Cedar River.

Attractions

Rattlesnake Lake attracts many people during the summer.

Fishing is also popular.

The lake has many tree stumps which are exposed when the water level is low enough. The exposed stumps are often used by birds as nesting sites.

The spacious, grassy shores around the lake are used for many outdoor activities, including slacklining and picnicking.

The park serves as trailheads for both the Snoqualmie Valley Trail and the Palouse to Cascades State Park Trail.

References

External links

Lakes of Washington (state)
Lakes of King County, Washington
Mount Baker-Snoqualmie National Forest